Myxodes viridis is a species of clinid native to the Pacific coast of South America from southern Peru to central Chile.  This species can reach a maximum length of  TL.

References

viridis
Fish described in 1836
Taxa named by Achille Valenciennes